Liptena undularis is a butterfly in the family Lycaenidae. It is found in Cameroon, Gabon, the Republic of the Congo, the Democratic Republic of the Congo and Angola.

References

Butterflies described in 1866
Liptena
Butterflies of Africa
Taxa named by William Chapman Hewitson